The thermal grill illusion is a sensory illusion originally demonstrated in 1896 by the Swedish physician Torsten Thunberg. The illusion is created by an interlaced grill of bars which are warm, e.g. , and cool, e.g. . When someone presses a hand against the grill, they experience the illusion of burning heat. But if the person presses against only a cool bar, only coolness is experienced; if the person presses against only a warm bar, only warmth is experienced.

Researchers have used the illusion to demonstrate that burning pain sensation is in fact a mixture of both cold and heat pain and that it is only the inhibition of the cold pain "channel" that reveals the heat component.

The illusion is demonstrated by positioning the middle finger in cold water and the ring and index fingers in warm water. Due to shortcomings in the body map - multisensory representation of the body - and this particular sensory input configuration, for some people the brain is tricked into thinking the middle finger is in the warm water and the index and ring fingers in cold water.

In an fMRI experiment of the illusion, researchers recently observed an activation of the thalamus not seen for control stimuli. Also, activity in a portion of the right mid/anterior insula correlated with the perceived unpleasantness of the illusion.

Notes

Further reading 
 Craig, A. D., Bushnell, M. C. The thermal grill illusion: unmasking the burn of cold pain. Science. 1994; 265: 252–5.
 Defrin, R., Ohry, A., Blumen, N., Urca, G. Sensory determinants of thermal pain. Brain. 2002; 125: 501–10. 
 "How the 'Thermal Grill' Illusion Tricks the Mind" 

Tactile illusions